The 2013 WNBA season was the 15th season for the Minnesota Lynx of the Women's National Basketball Association. The Lynx won their second WNBA Championship in three years, and led the league in wins for the third straight season.

The Lynx entered the season as the two-time defending WNBA Western Conference champions. The Lynx won the 2011 WNBA Finals, but lost the 2012 WNBA Finals to the Indiana Fever.

The 2012 season saw the retirement of veteran center Taj McWilliams-Franklin.  The Lynx replaced her in the offseason, trading guard Candice Wiggins for former University of Minnesota standout Janel McCarville, who had played with Lynx point guard Lindsay Whalen in college.

Despite returning three olympians and an all-star in their starting lineup, the Lynx were considered something of an afterthought going into the season, with much of the press going to the Phoenix Mercury, which drafted Brittney Griner.

Despite the lowered expectations, the Lynx had another outstanding season, finishing with the best record in the WNBA for the third straight year, and placing four players in the WNBA All-Star Game. After dispatching the Seattle Storm in the opening round of the playoffs, the Lynx swept the Phoenix Mercury in the Western Conference Finals, to earn their third straight trip to the WNBA Finals. They then defeated the Atlanta Dream to win their second WNBA title in three years.

Transactions

WNBA Draft
The following are the Lynx' selections in the 2013 WNBA Draft.
{| class="wikitable"
! style="background:#054EA4; color:#D3D3D3;" width="2%"| Round
! style="background:#054EA4; color:#D3D3D3;" width="5%"| Pick
! style="background:#054EA4; color:#D3D3D3;" width="10%"| Player
! style="background:#054EA4; color:#D3D3D3;" width="10%"| Nationality
! style="background:#054EA4; color:#D3D3D3;" width="10%"| School/Team/Country
|-
| 1
| 12
| Lindsey Moore
|  United States
| Nebraska 
|-
| 2
| 14 (From Phx.)
| Sugar Rodgers
| 
| Georgetown
|-
| 2
| 24
| Chucky Jeffery
| 
| Colorado
|-
| 3
| 36
| Waltiea Rolle
| 
| North Carolina
|-
|}

Trades
On March 1, 2013, the Lynx announced that they had traded Candice Wiggins to the Tulsa Shock in exchange for a third-round pick in the draft and the rights to Janel McCarville from the New York Liberty.

Personnel changes

Additions

Subtractions

Roster

Depth

Season standings

Schedule

Preseason

|- style="background:#cfc;"
		 | 1 
		 | May 18
		 |  Washington
		 | 
		 | Monica Wright (16)
		 | Rebekkah Brunson (6)
		 | Monica Wright (4)
		 | Bismarck Civic Center1513
		 | 1–0
|- style="background:#fcc;"
		 | 2 
		 | May 21
		 |  Connecticut
		 | 
		 | Seimone Augustus (15)
		 | Rebekkah Brunson (10)
		 | Lindsay Whalen (8)
		 | Target Center2803
		 | 1–1

Regular season

|- style="background:#cfc;"
		 | 1 
		 | June 1
		 |  Connecticut
		 | 
		 | Maya Moore (26)
		 | M. Moore & Peters (7)
		 | M. Moore & Wright (5)
		 | Target Center9223
		 | 1–0
|- style="background:#cfc;"
		 | 2 
		 | June 6
		 |  Phoenix
		 | 
		 | Maya Moore (22)
		 | Rebekkah Brunson (10)
		 | Lindsay Whalen (10)
		 | Target Center8511
		 | 2–0
|- style="background:#fcc;"
		 | 3 
		 | June 8
		 | @ Washington
		 | 
		 | Maya Moore (22)
		 | Rebekkah Brunson (17)
		 | Lindsay Whalen (9)
		 | Verizon Center7870
		 | 2–1
|- style="background:#cfc;"
		 | 4 
		 | June 11
		 |  San Antonio
		 | 
		 | Lindsay Whalen (23)
		 | Maya Moore (9)
		 | Lindsay Whalen (6)
		 | Target Center7913
		 | 3–1
|- style="background:#cfc;"
		 | 5 
		 | June 14
		 | @ Tulsa
		 | 
		 | Rebekkah Brunson (19)
		 | Rebekkah Brunson (13)
		 | Augustus & M. Moore (4)
		 | BOK Center5273
		 | 4–1
|- style="background:#cfc;"
		 | 6 
		 | June 19
		 | @ Phoenix
		 | 
		 | Maya Moore (26)
		 | Maya Moore (16)
		 | Maya Moore (5)
		 | US Airways Center8464
		 | 5–1
|- style="background:#fcc;"
		 | 7 
		 | June 21
		 | @ Los Angeles
		 | 
		 | Monica Wright (14)
		 | Sugar Rodgers (6)
		 | Harris & Wright (3)
		 | Staples Center6490
		 | 5–2
|- style="background:#cfc;"
		 | 8 
		 | June 23
		 |  Tulsa
		 | 
		 | Augustus & M. Moore (22)
		 | Rebekkah Brunson (11)
		 | Lindsay Whalen (9)
		 | Target Center8423
		 | 6–2
|- style="background:#cfc;"
		 | 9 
		 | June 28
		 |  Los Angeles
		 | 
		 | Lindsay Whalen (20)
		 | Brunson, M. Moore, & Peters (9)
		 | Lindsay Whalen (6)
		 | Target Center8814
		 | 7–2

|- style="background:#fcc;"
		 | 10 
		 | July 2
		 | @ Los Angeles
		 | 
		 | Lindsay Whalen (19)
		 | Rebekkah Brunson (12)
		 | Lindsay Whalen (4)
		 | Staples Center7856
		 | 7–3
|- style="background:#cfc;"
		 | 11 
		 | July 7
		 |  Phoenix
		 | 
		 | Maya Moore (23)
		 | Devereaux Peters (10)
		 | Maya Moore (5)
		 | Target Center9104
		 | 8–3
|- style="background:#cfc;"
		 | 12 
		 | July 9
		 |  Atlanta
		 | 
		 | Monica Wright (22)
		 | Rebekkah Brunson (12)
		 | Whalen & Wright (5)
		 | Target Center8623
		 | 9–3
|- style="background:#cfc;"
		 | 13 
		 | July 11
		 | @ Indiana
		 | 
		 | Lindsay Whalen (23)
		 | Monica Wright (9)
		 | Monica Wright (4)
		 | Bankers Life Fieldhouse10230
		 | 10–3
|- style="background:#cfc;"
		 | 14 
		 | July 13
		 | @ Tulsa
		 | 
		 | Lindsay Whalen (25)
		 | Rebekkah Brunson (12)
		 | Lindsay Whalen (11)
		 | BOK Center6171
		 | 11–3
|- style="background:#cfc;"
		 | 15 
		 | July 19
		 | @ San Antonio
		 | 
		 | Lindsay Whalen (21)
		 | Maya Moore (8)
		 | Lindsay Whalen (7)
		 | AT&T Center7105
		 | 12–3
|- style="background:#cfc;"
		 | 16 
		 | July 21
		 | @ Phoenix
		 | 
		 | Rebekkah Brunson (18)
		 | Rebekkah Brunson (13)
		 | Augustus & McCarville (4)
		 | US Airways Center9806
		 | 13–3
|- style="background:#cfc;"
		 | 17 
		 | July 24
		 |  Phoenix
		 | 
		 | Lindsay Whalen (18)
		 | Rebekkah Brunson (7)
		 | Lindsay Whalen (7)
		 | Target Center16404
		 | 14–3

|- align="center"
|colspan="9" bgcolor="#bbcaff"|All-Star Break
|- style="background:#cfc;"
		 | 18 
		 | August 2
		 |  San Antonio
		 | 
		 | Seimone Augustus (18)
		 | Rebekkah Brunson (12)
		 | Lindsay Whalen (8)
		 | Target Center8733
		 | 15–3
|- style="background:#cfc;"
		 | 19 
		 | August 4
		 |  Seattle
		 | 
		 | Lindsay Whalen (22)
		 | Rebekkah Brunson (11)
		 | McCarville & Whalen (7)
		 | Target Center9032
		 | 16–3
|- style="background:#cfc;"
		 | 20 
		 | August 6
		 | @ San Antonio
		 | 
		 | Maya Moore (26)
		 | Maya Moore (10)
		 | Lindsay Whalen (10)
		 | AT&T Center5390
		 | 17–3
|- style="background:#fcc;"
		 | 21 
		 | August 8
		 |  Washington
		 | 
		 | Maya Moore (24)
		 | Rebekkah Brunson (7)
		 | Lindsay Whalen (5)
		 | Target Center8723
		 | 17–4
|- style="background:#fcc;"
		 | 22 
		 | August 11
		 | @ Chicago
		 | 
		 | Seimone Augustus (26)
		 | Lindsay Whalen (10)
		 | Augustus & Whalen (6)
		 | Allstate Arena6297
		 | 17–5
|- style="background:#fcc;"
		 | 23 
		 | August 16
		 |  Tulsa
		 | 
		 | Seimone Augustus (29)
		 | Devereaux Peters (8)
		 | Lindsay Whalen (6)
		 | Target Center9422
		 | 17–6
|- style="background:#cfc;"
		 | 24 
		 | August 18
		 |  NY Liberty
		 | 
		 | Maya Moore (28)
		 | Rebekkah Brunson (8)
		 | Lindsay Whalen (7)
		 | Target Center9004
		 | 18–6
|- style="background:#fcc;"
		 | 25 
		 | August 20
		 | @ Atlanta
		 | 
		 | Maya Moore (23)
		 | Rebekkah Brunson (14)
		 | Lindsay Whalen (6)
		 | Philips Arena4855
		 | 18–7
|- style="background:#cfc;"
		 | 26 
		 | August 22
		 | @ Connecticut
		 | 
		 | Rebekkah Brunson (24)
		 | Rebekkah Brunson (11)
		 | Seimone Augustus (6)
		 | Mohegan Sun Arena7088
		 | 19–7
|- style="background:#cfc;"
		 | 27 
		 | August 24
		 |  Indiana
		 | 
		 | Maya Moore (35)
		 | Lindsay Whalen (9)
		 | Lindsay Whalen (7)
		 | Target Center9504
		 | 20–7
|- style="background:#cfc;"
		 | 28 
		 | August 27
		 | @ NY Liberty
		 | 
		 | Lindsay Whalen (18)
		 | Maya Moore (10)
		 | Seimone Augustus (3)
		 | Prudential Center5997
		 | 21–7
|- style="background:#cfc;"
		 | 29 
		 | August 31
		 |  Seattle
		 | 
		 | Maya Moore (30)
		 | Monica Wright (6)
		 | Monica Wright (7)
		 | Target Center9123
		 | 22–7

|- style="background:#cfc;"
		 | 30 
		 | September 4
		 |  Los Angeles
		 | 
		 | Seimone Augustus (23)
		 | Rebekkah Brunson (11)
		 | Lindsay Whalen (14)
		 | Target Center9314
		 | 23–7
|- style="background:#cfc;"
		 | 31 
		 | September 7
		 | @ Seattle
		 | 
		 | Rebekkah Brunson (19)
		 | McCarville & Peters (10)
		 | McCarville & Whalen (4)
		 | Key Arena8147
		 | 24–7
|- style="background:#cfc;"
		 | 32 
		 | September 10
		 | @ Seattle
		 | 
		 | Maya Moore (20)
		 | Rebekkah Brunson (8)
		 | Lindsay Whalen (4)
		 | Key Arena5486
		 | 25–7
|- style="background:#fcc;"
		 | 33 
		 | September 12
		 | @ Los Angeles
		 | 
		 | Seimone Augustus (23)
		 | Rebekkah Brunson (11)
		 | Whalen & Wright (4)
		 | Staples Center11553
		 | 25–8
|- style="background:#cfc;"
		 | 34 
		 | September 14
		 |  Chicago
		 | 
		 | Lindsay Whalen (23)
		 | Maya Moore (11)
		 | M. Moore & Whalen (6)
		 | Target Center9613
		 | 26–8

Playoffs

|- style="background:#cfc;"
		 | 1 
		 | September 20
		 |  Seattle
		 | 
		 | Seimone Augustus (19)
		 | Rebekkah Brunson (9)
		 | Maya Moore (6)
		 | Target Center8832
		 | 1–0
|- style="background:#cfc;"
		 | 2 
		 | September 22
		 | @ Seattle
		 | 
		 | Maya Moore (22)
		 | Rebekkah Brunson (13)
		 | Janel McCarville (5)
		 | Tacoma Dome3457
		 | 2–0

|- style="background:#cfc;"
		 | 1 
		 | September 26
		 | Phoenix
		 | 
		 | M. Moore and Whalen (20)
		 | Lindsay Whalen (6)
		 | Lindsay Whalen (5)
		 | Target Center9013
		 | 1-0
|- style="background:#cfc;"
		 | 2 
		 | September 29
		 | @ Phoenix
		 | 
		 | Maya Moore (27)
		 | Rebekkah Brunson (14)
		 | Lindsay Whalen (7)
		 | US Airways Center8020
		 | 2-0

|- style="background:#cfc;"
		 | 1 
                 | October 6
		 | Atlanta
		 | 
		 | Maya Moore (23)
		 | Rebekkah Brunson (8)
		 | Lindsay Whalen (5)
		 | Target Center13804
		 | 1-0
|- style="background:#cfc;"
		 | 2 
		 | October 8
		 | Atlanta
		 | 
		 | Seimone Augustus (20)
		 | Rebekkah Brunson (10)
		 | Lindsay Whalen (5)
		 | Target Center12313
		 | 2-0
|- style="background:#cfc;"
		 | 3
		 | October 10
		 | @ Atlanta
		 | 
		 | Maya Moore (23)
		 | Rebekkah Brunson (12)
		 | Lindsay Whalen (6)
		 | Gwinnett Arena5040
		 | 3-0

Statistics

Regular season

Awards and honorsWNBA ChampionsWNBA Finals MVP - Maya MooreAll-WNBA First Team - Maya Moore, Lindsay WhalenAll-WNBA Second Team - Seimone AugustusAll-WNBA Defensive Second Team - Rebekkah BrunsonWNBA Western Conference Player of the Month (August) - Maya MooreWNBA Western Conference Player of the Month (September) - Maya MooreWNBA Player of the Week - Maya Moore (3 times), Rebekkah BrunsonWNBA All-Stars'' - Seimone Augustus, Maya Moore, Rebekkah Brunson, Lindsay Whalen

WNBA Record for Fewest Turnovers per Game (12.1)

References

External links
2013 Minnesota Lynx season at Official Site

Minnesota Lynx seasons
Minnesota
Women's National Basketball Association championship seasons
Western Conference (WNBA) championship seasons
Minnesota Lynx